Aethrikos is a monospecific genus of ovoviviparous velvet worm, containing the single species Aethrikos setosa. This species has 15 pairs of legs in both sexes. This species exhibits lecithotrophic ovoviviparity; that is, mothers in this species retain yolky eggs in their uteri. The type locality of this species is Styx River State Forest, New South Wales, Australia.

References

Further reading 
 

Onychophorans of Australasia
Onychophoran genera
Monotypic protostome genera
Taxa named by Amanda Reid (malacologist)